Wilhelmina (minor planet designation: 392 Wilhelmina) is a large Main belt asteroid.

It was discovered by Max Wolf on 4 November 1894 in Heidelberg, Germany.

References

External links
 
 

Background asteroids
Wilhelmina
Wilhelmina
Ch-type asteroids (SMASS)
18941104